Basil Boothby CMG (9 September 1910 – 9 February 1990) was a British ambassador.

Career
Evelyn Basil Boothby (of the family of the Boothby baronets) was educated at Winchester College and Corpus Christi College, Cambridge. He joined the Diplomatic Service in 1933 as a student interpreter in the China Consular Service, and continued to work in China until 1945 except for brief interludes in the United States and India during World War II. After the war he was appointed vice-consul in Athens where he met Susan Asquith, granddaughter of H. H. Asquith: they married in 1946. Later he was Counsellor in Rangoon 1951–54, acting as chargé d'affaires between ambassadors. He was Counsellor in the  British Embassy in Brussels 1954–59, Head of the African Department at the Foreign Office 1959–62, Ambassador to Iceland 1962–65 and Permanent Representative to the Council of Europe 1965–69. After retiring from the Diplomatic Service he taught at Morley College and later at the Department of Extra-Mural Studies, University of London.

"Basil Boothby was a diplomat more successful in giving foreigners a good impression of Britain than in giving his superiors a good impression of himself. Had it been the other way round, he would almost certainly have risen higher than he did." — The Times, London, 22 February 1990, page 16

References
BOOTHBY, (Evelyn) Basil, Who Was Who, A & C Black, 1920–2008; online edn, Oxford University Press, Dec 2007
Basil Boothby: An independent and under-appreciated diplomat, The Times, London, 22 February 1990, page 16

1910 births
1990 deaths
People educated at Winchester College
Alumni of Corpus Christi College, Cambridge
Ambassadors of the United Kingdom to Iceland
Council of Europe people
Companions of the Order of St Michael and St George